Keuhkot is a Finnish one man avantgarde band whose only member is Kake Puhuu (aka Kalevi Rainio) from Pomarkku. Keuhkot started in 1988. Keuhkot's music has been described as post-punk, industrial or antimusic. Keuhkot concerts are performances in which Puhuu may perform from large bird nest boxes or from lecterns.

Discography

Albums 
 Musiikkia konduktöörivaunuihin / Älä koskaan kuuntele musiikkia - LP (Something Weird, Islanti, 1995)
 Keuhkot / Euroopan huonointa lapsipornografiaa / Jumala ei välitä / Virallinen valvoja / Nuori ja vihainen // Älä koskaan kuuntele musiikkia / Pääministeri muuttuu geometriseksi / Ensirakkaus / Tylsä & yksinäinen
 Mitä otat mukaan muistoksi sivistyksestä - LP/CD (Bad Vugum, 1996)
 Hajusinfonia / Eliökunnan hierarkiamarssi / Johannes Täi - hyvä loinen / Tunnustettu / Ajattelen mahdollisuuksiani / Riemun oksennus // Irtiotto / Lohtu / Ihanneammatti / Tiputus / Kári Svanur
 CD includes also EPs Lihaa y-akselilla olen oikeassa and latistaa totuudenetsinnän sanahelinäksi
 Ruskea aikakirja - CD (Bad Vugum, 1998)
 Hauska nähdä teitä taas / Ensimmäiset vapaat vaalit / 24h risteily / Koonit / Helmihäät / Kuka meitä nyt suojelee, kun poliisitkin on ammuttu / Ehec World Tour 1998 / Konsultti / Vapaata kilpailua / Ruskea Aika / Parantaja Koo / Julkisen kuvan kiillotus / Jumala
 Minun käy sääliksi bilharzialoista - CD (Bad Vugum, 2000)
 Epäjumala kohottaa kasvonsa / Uuskiiman ihana väristys / Lentävät kivet / Kirja / Raiteet ristissä / Ajatus / Tulosopimusneuvottelu / Surkea esitys / Häntä / Etelänlomalla / Bilharzia / Huipulla
 Peruskivi Francon betonia - CD (2002)
 Pois Zagorasta / Syksyn kirjasatoa / Maankäyttö: Suunnittelu & Toteutus / Seitsemän manipuloitua veljestä / Puhumatta paras / Helsingin jätevedet / Kauppaa teroituslaitteesta / Lomasuomi / Nollalukulaiset / Francon betonia / Kaste
 Toimintatapoja olioille - CD (2005)
 Presentaatio Raumanjuovassa / Ilmastonmuutos / Peshawar-Kandahar-Espoo-Köbenhavn / Muistikortti / Seuraan Leijonaa / Yhteiselle taipaleelle / Amir kätkee aseet nopeimmin / Kääntäkää kivetkin / Vastuu / Hiljainen hetki uhrien muistolle (One-minute Silence For the Victims) / EVA / Datametsa / Takaisin Raumanjuopaan

EPs 
 Musiikkia konduktöörivaunuihin - 7-inch EP (Stigma, 1989)
 Keuhkot / Euroopan huonointa lapsipornografiaa // Jumala ei välitä / Virallinen valvoja
 Älä koskaan kuuntele musiikkia - 7-inch EP (Stigma, 1990)
 Älä koskaan kuuntele musiikkia / Pääministeri muuttuu geometriseksi // Ensirakkaus / Tylsä & yksinäinen
 Lihaa y-akselilla olen oikeassa - 7-inch EP (Bad Vugum, 1991)
 Älä koskaan kuuntele ihmisiä / Hohtimet & jakoavain // Aikaani edellä / Lihaa y-akselilla
 Keuhkot latistaa totuudenetsinnän sanahelinäksi - 7-inch EP (Bad Vugum, 1993)
 Huonot jumalat / Siitinjulistus // Rakkaus rinnassa / Katatoninen sankari / Lisääntyminen
 Vasen ja oikea - CD-EP (Bad Vugum, 1997)
 Vihdoinkin ei ketään / Höpsisskepsis / Vuoden kuollut mies / Vuoden kuollut nainen / Olen tässä / Vasen ja oikea

Compilations featuring Keuhkot 
 Maanalainen vuosikerta 1989 - LP (Stigma, 1989)
 Keuhkot: Nuori ja vihainen
 Mykistäviä välikohtauksia: Ovelamman musiikin kokoelma - LP/CD (Bad Vugum, 1993)
 Keuhkot: Kiihkoilijan masentava iltapäivä / Poliisia ei arvosteta, mutta sehän onkin jo klisee / Liikaa järkee
 B.V.O.D.: pre-millennium Bad Vugum - CD (Bad Vugum, 1999)
 Keuhkot: Ihanneammatti / 24h Risteily
 Avanto 2001 - CD (Avanto Records, 2001)
 Keuhkot: Käynnistys on suuri hetki
 Cabaret nocturno vol. III - CD (Zerga, 2002)
 Keuhkot: Naisia sementtiin (1988)

References

External links
Ektro Records: Keuhkot

Finnish art rock groups
Finnish industrial music groups
Finnish post-punk music groups
Musical groups established in 1988
Pomarkku